The Skirmish of Chenab was a minor skirmish between the Sikh forces led by Jassa Singh Ahluwalia and the Persian forces led by Nader Shah. It occurred when Nader Shah was leaving India after looting Delhi.

Background

The Mughal Empire was weakened as it was corrupted and kept getting defeated by the Marathas. India was one of the wealthiest countries at that time which is what attracted Nader Shah to India just like many other invaders before. The 3 main Muslim empires at that time were the Ottoman Empire, Afsharid Dynasty, and the Mughal Empire. The Mughals were the wealthiest out of the three. After the invasions the last one for Nader Shah was Delhi, the city with the most wealth. After sacking the entirety of Delhi including the Koh-i-Noor and some slaves, Nader Shah decided to leave for Iran.

The raid

Nader Shah had decided to go through the mountains in Northern Punjab to leave India. Learning about this the Sikhs started gathering light cavalry bands so with the main objective to enrich their depleted resources. They seized a large amount of booty. The Persian troops were unable to pursue them successfully as they were overloaded with booty and oppressed by the terrible heat of May. They also released many slaves.

Aftermath

Nader Shah called a halt at Lahore where he got the news of his losses in the booty. He was extremely enraged and made enquires about the plunder. There he was accompanied by Zakariya Khan who asked him who were the troublemakers. Upon knowing about the Sikhs, he told Zakariya Khan that these rebels will rule the land one day.

Even after the Sikhs looted Nader Shah's booty, there was so much left that it was enough to stop taxes in Iran for 3 whole years. After Nader Shah's assassination in 1747, his successor Ahmed Shah Abdali later went on and attack the Sikhs for over 20 years.

References

Works cited

See also 

 Nihang
 Martyrdom and Sikhism

Battles involving the Sikhs
Campaigns of Nader Shah
Chenab 1739
Conflicts in 1739
1739 in India